Khepermaatre Ramesses X (also written Ramses and Rameses) (ruled c. 1111 BC – 1107 BC) was the ninth pharaoh of the 20th Dynasty of Ancient Egypt. His birth name was Amonhirkhepeshef. His prenomen or throne name, Khepermaatre, means "The Justice of Re Abides."

His accession day fell on 1 prt 27 (first month of the Winter season, day 27).
His highest attested regnal year is year 3. The highest attested date in his reign is either "year 3, second month of the Inundation season, day 2" or possibly "year 3, month 4 (no day given)".

Since Ramesses XI came to the throne on 3 šmw 20 (third month of the Summer season, day 20), it automatically follows that Ramesses X must have lived into an as yet unattested regnal year 4.
The theory put forward on astronomical grounds by Richard Parker that Ramesses X may have reigned for 9 years, has since been abandoned.
Likewise, the suggested ascription of Theban graffito 1860a to a hypothetical year 8 of Ramesses X is no longer supported.

The English Egyptologist Aidan Dodson wrote in a 2004 book:

 No evidence is known to indicate the relationship between the final kings Ramesses IX, X and XI. If they were a father-son succession, Tyti, who bears the titles of King's Daughter, King's Wife and King's Mother, would seem [to be] a good candidate for the wife of Ramesses X, but little else can be discerned.

However, Dodson's hypothesis here on Tyti's position must now be discarded since it has been proven in 2010 that Tyti was rather a queen of a previous 20th dynasty pharaoh instead. She is mentioned in the partly fragmented Harris papyrus to be Ramesses III's wife as Dodson himself acknowledges.

Ramesses X is a poorly documented king. His year 2 is attested by Papyrus Turin 1932+1939 while his third year is documented in the Necropolis Journal of the Workmen of Deir El Medina. This diary mentions the general idleness of the necropolis workmen, at least partly due to the threat posed by Libyan marauders in the Valley of the Kings. It records that the Deir El-Medina workmen were absent from work in Year 3 IIIrd Month of Peret (i.e., Winter) days 6, 9, 11, 12, 18, 21 and 24 for fear of the "desert-dwellers" (i.e., the Libyans or Meshwesh) who evidently roamed through Upper Egypt and Thebes at will.  This is partly a reflection of the massive Libyan influx into the Western Delta region of Lower Egypt during this time. Ramesses X is also the last New Kingdom king whose rule over Nubia is attested from an inscription at Aniba.

His KV18 tomb in the Valley of the Kings was left unfinished. It is uncertain if he was ever buried there, since no remains or fragments of funerary objects were discovered within it.

References

External links

 KV18: The Tomb of Ramesses X
 

 
12th-century BC Pharaohs
Pharaohs of the Twentieth Dynasty of Egypt
Year of birth unknown
1107 BC deaths
Ramesses IX